The 2018 Industrial Bank Cup was a professional tennis tournament played on outdoor hard courts. It was the tenth edition of the tournament and was part of the 2018 ITF Women's Circuit. It took place in Quanzhou, China, on 23–29 April 2018.

Singles main draw entrants

Seeds 

 1 Rankings as of 16 April 2018.

Other entrants 
The following players received a wildcard into the singles main draw:
  Guo Hanyu
  He Yunqi
  Ren Jiaqi
  Yuan Yue

The following player received entry using a junior exempt:
  Wang Xinyu

The following players received entry from the qualifying draw:
  Gai Ao
  Sun Xuliu
  Zhang Kailin
  Zheng Wushuang

The following player received entry as a lucky loser:
  Kang Jiaqi

Champions

Singles

 Zheng Saisai def.  Liu Fangzhou, 6–3, 6–1

Doubles
 
 Han Xinyun /  Ye Qiuyu def.  Guo Hanyu /  Wang Xinyu, 7–6(7–3), 7–6(8–6)

External links 
 2018 Industrial Bank Cup at ITFtennis.com

2018 ITF Women's Circuit
2018 in Chinese tennis
Industrial Bank Cup